A car jockey, also known as traffic jockey and known in Indonesian as joki three-in-one (referring to the "three in one" rule, the term used for high-occupancy vehicle rule), was someone in Indonesia who had resorted to informal employment to bypass the gridlock that grips Indonesia's largest cities, especially Greater Jakarta. They were paid by drivers to ride on vehicles, so that those vehicles would be qualified to use high-occupancy vehicle lane.  Like atappers and ojeks, it was one method Indonesians have become accustomed to in their daily commuting struggle.

How it works
A car jockey solicits by the side of the road a random commuter who does not have enough passengers to legally use a carpool lane.  The jockey offers to go along with the commuter for a fixed price.  This was a way to bypass carpool restrictions requiring a certain number of passengers.  It also offers the poor a way of making money without formal work.  As passengers, babies also make money for their parents.

Jakarta carpool rule suspension
In April 2016 Jakarta suspended the "3-in-1" rule that had created the demand for the car jockeys, leading to unemployment for jockeys, some of whom had been doing this work for years. On August 30, 2016, an odd–even rationing (ganjil-genap) system began to replace "3-in-1" rule, after a successful trial. Odd plate numbers can enter former "3-in-1" areas on odd days and even plate numbers on even ones.

References

Transport in Jakarta